Didan-e Sofla (also Romanized as Dīdān-e Soflá; also known as Dīdān-e Ḩoseynī) is a village in Baranduz Rural District, in the Central District of Urmia County, West Azerbaijan Province, Iran. At the 2006 census, its population was 680, in 165 families.

References 

Populated places in Urmia County